Victor Fredrich "Vic" Althouse (born April 15, 1937 in Wadena, Saskatchewan) is a Canadian former politician. Althouse represented the electoral districts of Humboldt—Lake Centre from 1980 to 1988, and Mackenzie from 1988 to 1997, in the House of Commons of Canada.

He was a member of the New Democratic Party.

External links

1937 births
Living people
Members of the House of Commons of Canada from Saskatchewan
New Democratic Party MPs
People from Wadena, Saskatchewan